Freshman Love is a 1936 sound film based on George Ade's oft filmed 1904 play The College Widow, adaptations of which were filmed twice previously, in 1915 and 1927, and parodied by the Marx Brothers in their 1932 film Horse Feathers. This version is directed by William McGann and is a comedy-musical starring Patricia Ellis.

This is Lloyd Bridges' first film.

A print is preserved at the Library of Congress.

Plot

Male students are tricked into joining Billings College's rowing team when the coach, Speed Hammond, is able to persuade the school president's attractive daughter, Joan Simpkins, to recruit them.

Bob Wilson is one of the rowers, but due to a problem with his grades, he ends up enrolling under a phony name. Adversaries try everything, even music, to distract the Billings crew during the big race, but the team holds on for victory.

Cast

Patricia Ellis - Joan Simpkins
Warren Hull - Bob Wilson
Frank McHugh - Coach Speed Hammond
Mary Treen - Squirmy
Joseph Cawthorne (as Joseph Cawthorn) - Bob Wilson, Sr. Z
Alma Lloyd - Sandra
George E. Stone - E. Predergast Biddle
Henry O'Neill - President Simpkins
Anita Kerry - Princess Oggi
Johnny Arthur - Fields
Walter Johnson - Tony Foster
Joseph Sawyer - Coach Kendall
Florence Fair - Mrs. Norton
Spec O'Donnell - Eddie
Joseph King - Terry Biddle
William Moore - Editor
Ben Hall - Goofy freshman
Nestor Aber - Third goof
Bill Carew - Student at soda fountain

uncredited

Lloyd Bridges
William Carey
Virginia Dabney - Co-Ed
Don Downen - Second Goof
Jerry Fletcher - Leader of Tango Band
Tommy Hicks - College Boy
Robert Emmett Keane - Announcer
Joe King - Terry Biddle
Edmund Mortimer - Henderson
George Noisom - Harmonica Player
Broderick O'Farrell - Member of Board of Trustees
Peter Potter - Vindicator Editor
Dick Purcell - Radio Announcer
Harry Seymour - Oggi's Barker
Michael Stuart - Third Goof
Fred "Snowflake" Toones - Mose
Ruth Warren - Marie, Housemother
Jack Wise - Oggi's Attendant
Sam Wolfe - Harmonica Player
Jane Wyman - Co-Ed

References

External links
Freshman Love at IMDb.com
allmovie/synopsis

1936 films
Warner Bros. films
American football films
American films based on plays
1936 musical comedy films
American black-and-white films
American musical comedy films
Films set in universities and colleges
Rowing films
1930s English-language films
Films directed by William C. McGann
1930s American films